Out of Our Heads is a 1965 album by the English rock band the Rolling Stones, released in two editions with different covers and track listings. In the US, London Records released it on 30 July 1965 as the band's 4th American album, while Decca Records released its UK edition on 24 September 1965 as the 3rd British album.

Besides the key band members of singer Mick Jagger, guitarists Brian Jones and Keith Richards, bassist Bill Wyman, and drummer Charlie Watts, the album also contains musical contributions from former Rolling Stones member Ian Stewart. It was produced by the group's manager Andrew Loog Oldham.

As with the prior two albums, it consists mostly of covers of American blues, soul and rhythm and blues songs, though the group wrote some of their own material for this album (4 out of the 12 tracks on the UK version, and 6 out of 12 for the USA version). The American version contains "(I Can't Get No) Satisfaction", which would be the band's first number one US hit, and would go on to top the charts in 10 other countries, including the band's native UK, and being ranked as the second greatest song of all time by Rolling Stone.

Out of Our Heads became the group's first number one on the American Billboard 200 album chart; in the UK it charted at number two.

Musical style 
The majority of the songs on Out of Our Heads were written and previously recorded by American  rhythm and blues artists. According to music critic Richie Unterberger, the album's US release largely had mid-1960s soul covers and "classic rock singles" written by the band, including "The Last Time", "Play with Fire", and "Satisfaction", still drew on the band's R&B and blues roots, but were updated to "a more guitar-based, thoroughly contemporary context." Among the soul covers were Marvin Gaye's "Hitch Hike", Solomon Burke's "Cry to Me", and Sam Cooke's "Good Times". Kent H. Benjamin of The Austin Chronicle wrote that the album is "the culmination of the Stones' early soul/R&B sound". Writing of the album's UK edition, AllMusic's Bruce Eder characterised it as rock and roll and R&B.

Release and reception 

The British Out of Our Heads – with a different cover – added songs that would surface later in the US on December's Children (And Everybody's) and others that had not been released in the UK thus far (such as "Heart of Stone") instead of the already-released live track and recent hit singles (as singles rarely featured on albums in the UK in those times). Issued later that September, Out of Our Heads reached number two in the UK charts behind the Beatles' Help!. It was the Rolling Stones' last UK album to rely upon rhythm and blues covers; the forthcoming Aftermath was entirely composed by Mick Jagger and Keith Richards.

Initially issued in July 1965 in the US, Out of Our Heads (featuring a shot from the same photo session that was used for the cover of 12 X 5 and The Rolling Stones No. 2) was a mixture of recordings made over a six-month period, including the Top 10 hit "The Last Time" and the worldwide number one "(I Can't Get No) Satisfaction" with B-sides as well as a track from the UK-only live EP Got Live If You Want It!. Six songs would be included in the UK version of the album. "One More Try" is an original that was not released in the UK until 1971's Stone Age. Riding the wave of "Satisfaction"'s success, Out of Our Heads became the Rolling Stones' first US number one album, eventually going platinum.

The US edition of the album was included in Robert Christgau's "Basic Record Library" of 1950s and 1960s recordings, published in Christgau's Record Guide: Rock Albums of the Seventies (1981). In 2003, this edition was also listed at number 114 on the list of Rolling Stones 500 Greatest Albums of All Time, then was re-ranked at number 116 in the 2012 revised list.

In August 2002 both the US and UK editions of Out of Our Heads were reissued in a new remastered CD and SACD digipak by ABKCO Records.

Track listing 
All songs written by Mick Jagger and Keith Richards, except where noted

US edition

UK edition

Personnel 
The Rolling Stones
As per the American release:
Mick Jagger – lead vocals, backing vocals, harmonica , tambourine 
Keith Richards – electric guitar, backing vocals, acoustic guitar 
Brian Jones – electric guitar, acoustic guitar , harmonica , backing vocals
Bill Wyman – bass guitar, backing vocals
Charlie Watts – drums
Additional personnel
Jack Nitzsche – percussion, piano , organ , harpsichord 
Phil Spector – tuned-down electric guitar 
Ian Stewart – piano, marimba

Charts

Certifications

References

Further reading

External links 
 

1965 albums
ABKCO Records albums
Albums produced by Andrew Loog Oldham
Decca Records albums
London Records albums
The Rolling Stones albums